Summit County Courthouse, (1905-1908)  located at 209 South High Street, Akron, Ohio was designed in the Second Renaissance Style by Cleveland architect J. Milton Dyer.  The seated figures of Justice and Law were created by Cleveland sculptor Herman Matzen.  Two powerful lions guard the South High Street side of the building.

Dyer, a well known Cleveland, Ohio architect also worked with Cleveland sculptor Matzen again on the Lake County Courthouse, located in Painesville, Ohio, 1909.

The courthouse was added to the National Register of Historic Places in 1974.

References

External links

County courthouses in Ohio
Buildings and structures in Akron, Ohio
National Register of Historic Places in Summit County, Ohio
Courthouses on the National Register of Historic Places in Ohio